Hidary is a surname. Notable people with the surname include:

Jack Hidary, American businessman
Murray Hidary (born 1971), American businessman

See also
Hilary (name)